The Nazi book burnings were a campaign conducted by the German Student Union (DSt) to ceremonially burn books in Nazi Germany and Austria in the 1930s. The books targeted for burning were those viewed as being subversive or as representing ideologies opposed to Nazism. These included books written by Jewish, half-Jewish, communist, socialist, anarchist, liberal, pacifist, and sexologist authors among others. The initial books burned were those of Karl Marx and Karl Kautsky, but came to include very many authors, including Albert Einstein, Helen Keller, writers in French and English, and effectively any book incompatible with Nazi ideology. In a campaign of cultural genocide, books were also burned en masse by the Nazis in occupied territories, such as in Poland.

Campaign

Announcement 
On April 8, 1933, the Main Office for Press and Propaganda of the German Student Union (DSt) proclaimed a nationwide "Action against the Un-German Spirit", which was to climax in a literary purge or "cleansing" ("Säuberung") by fire. According to historian Karl Dietrich Bracher:

[T]he exclusion of "Left", democratic, and Jewish literature took precedence over everything else.  The black-lists ... ranged from Bebel, Bernstein, Preuss, and Rathenau through Einstein, Freud, Brecht, Brod, Döblin, Kaiser, the Mann brothers, Zweig, Plievier, Ossietzky, Remarque, Schnitzler, and Tucholsky, to Barlach, Bergengruen, Broch, Hoffmannsthal, Kästner, Kasack, Kesten, Kraus, Lasker-Schüler, Unruh, Werfel, Zuckmayer, and Hesse.  The catalogue went back far enough to include literature from Heine and Marx to Kafka.

Local chapters were to supply the press with releases and commissioned articles, sponsor well-known Nazis to speak at public gatherings, and negotiate for radio broadcast time. The DSt had contacted an official from the Propaganda Ministry to request support for their campaign, including having Propaganda Minister Josef Goebbels be the main speaker at the event in Berlin. Because Goebbels had studied under several Jewish professors, and had, in the past, praised them despite his avowed antisemitism, he was afraid that speaking at the book burning would cause these past remarks to be dug up by his enemies. As a result, he did not formally accept the invitation to speak – despite his having been listed in the advance publicity – until the last moment.

On the same day, the Student Union published the "Twelve Theses", a title chosen to be evocative of two events in German history: Martin Luther's burning of a papal bull when he posted his ninety-five theses in 1520, and the burning of a handful of items, including 11 books, at the 1817 Wartburg Festival on the 300th anniversary of Luther's burning of the bull. This was, however, a false comparison, as the "book burnings" at those historic events were not acts of censorship, nor destructive of other people's property, but purely symbolic protests, destroying only one individual document of each title, for a grand total of 12 individual documents, without any attempt to suppress their content, whereas the Student Union burned tens of thousands of volumes, all they could find from a list comprising around 4000 titles.

The "Twelve Theses" called for a "pure" national language and culture. Placards publicized the theses, which attacked "Jewish intellectualism", asserted the need to "purify" German language and literature, and demanded that universities be centres of German nationalism. The students described the action as a “response to a worldwide Jewish smear campaign against Germany and an affirmation of traditional German values.”

The burnings start 

The first large burning came on 6 May 1933. The German Student Union made an organised attack on Magnus Hirschfeld's Institut für Sexualwissenschaft (roughly: Institute of Sex Research). Its library and archives of around 20,000 books and journals were publicly hauled out and burned in the street. Its collection included unique works on intersexuality, homosexuality, and transgender topics. It's assumed that Dora Richter, the first transgender woman known to have undergone sex reassignment surgery (by doctors at the institute), may have been killed during the attack.

On 10 May 1933, the students burned upwards of 25,000 volumes of "un-German" books in the square at the State Opera, Berlin, thereby presaging an era of uncompromising state censorship. In many other university towns, nationalist students marched in torch lit parades against the "un-German" spirit. The scripted rituals of this night called for high Nazi officials, professors, rectors, and student leaders to address the participants and spectators. At the meeting places, students threw the pillaged, banned books into the bonfires with a great joyous ceremony that included live music, singing, "fire oaths," and incantations. In Berlin, some 40,000 people heard Joseph Goebbels deliver an address: "No to decadence and moral corruption!" Goebbels enjoined the crowd. "Yes to decency and morality in family and state! I consign to the flames the writings of Heinrich Mann, Ernst Glaeser, Erich Kästner."

In his speech – which was broadcast on the radio – Goebbels' referred to the authors whose books were being burned as "Intellectual filth" and "Jewish asphalt literati".

Not all book burnings took place on 10 May as the German Student Union had planned. Some were postponed a few days because of rain. Others, based on local chapter preference, took place on 21 June, the summer solstice, a traditional date of celebration. Nonetheless, in 34 university towns across Germany the "Action against the Un-German Spirit" was a success, enlisting widespread newspaper coverage. And in some places, notably Berlin, radio broadcasts brought the speeches, songs, and ceremonial incantations "live" to countless German listeners.

All of the following types of literature, as described by the Nazis, were to be banned:

 The works of traitors, emigrants and authors from foreign countries who believe they can attack and denigrate the new Germany (H. G. Wells, Romain Rolland);
 The literature of Marxism, Communism and Bolshevism;
 Pacifist literature;
 Literature with liberal, democratic tendencies and attitudes, and writings supporting the Weimar Republic (Walther Rathenau, Heinrich Mann, Thomas Mann);
 All historical writings whose purpose is to denigrate the origin, the spirit and the culture of the German Volk, or to dissolve the racial and structural order of the Volk, or that denies the force and importance of leading historical figures in favor of egalitarianism and the masses, and which seeks to drag them through the mud (Emil Ludwig);
 Books that advocate "art" which is decadent, bloodless, or purely constructivist (George Grosz, Otto Dix, Bauhaus, Felix Mendelssohn);
 Writings on sexuality and sexual education which serve the egocentric pleasure of the individual and thus, completely destroy the principles of race and Volk (Magnus Hirschfeld);
 The decadent, destructive and Volk-damaging writings of "Asphalt and Civilization" literati: (Oskar Maria Graf, Heinrich Mann, Stefan Zweig, Jakob Wassermann, Franz Blei);
 Literature by Jewish authors, regardless of the field;
 Popular entertainment literature that depicts life and life's goals in a superficial, unrealistic and sickly sweet manner, based on a bourgeois or upper class view of life;
 Patriotic kitsch in literature.
 Pornography and explicit literature 
 All books degrading German purity.

Many German students were complicit in the Nazi book burning campaign. They were known as Deutsche Studentenschaft, and when they ran out of books in their own libraries they turned to independent bookstores. Libraries were asked to stock their shelves with material that stood up to Hitler's standards, and destroy anything that did not.

Cultural genocide in occupied territories 
Among the Nazi crimes against the Polish nation was a campaign of cultural genocide that included the burning of millions of books, resulting in the destruction of an estimated 80% of all school libraries, and three-quarters of all scientific libraries in the country. The Nazis also seized many books from Jewish communities in Eastern Europe. They did intend to keep and display a few rare and ancient books in a museum on Judaism after the Final Solution was successfully completed.

Persecuted authors
Among the other German-speaking authors whose books student leaders burned were:

Vicki Baum, Walter Benjamin, Ernst Bloch, Franz Boas, Albert Einstein, Friedrich Engels, Etta Federn, Lion Feuchtwanger, Marieluise Fleißer, Leonhard Frank, Sigmund Freud, Iwan Goll, Jaroslav Hašek, Werner Hegemann, Hermann Hesse, Ödön von Horvath, Heinrich Eduard Jacob, Franz Kafka, Georg Kaiser, Alfred Kerr, Egon Kisch, Siegfried Kracauer, Theodor Lessing, Alexander Lernet-Holenia, Karl Liebknecht, Georg Lukács, Rosa Luxemburg, Klaus Mann, Ludwig Marcuse, Karl Marx, Robert Musil, Carl von Ossietzky, Erwin Piscator, Alfred Polgar, Gertrud von Puttkamer, Erich Maria Remarque, Ludwig Renn, Joachim Ringelnatz, Joseph Roth, Nelly Sachs, Felix Salten, Anna Seghers, Abraham Nahum Stencl, Carl Sternheim, Bertha von Suttner, Ernst Toller, Frank Wedekind, Franz Werfel, Grete Weiskopf, and Arnold Zweig.

Not only German-speaking authors were burned, but also French authors such as Henri Barbusse, André Gide, Victor Hugo and Romain Rolland; American writers such as John Dos Passos, Theodore Dreiser, F. Scott Fitzgerald, Ernest Hemingway, Helen Keller, Jack London, Upton Sinclair, and Margaret Sanger; as well as British authors Joseph Conrad, Radclyffe Hall, Aldous Huxley, D. H. Lawrence, Henry de Vere Stacpoole, H. G. Wells, Irish authors James Joyce and Oscar Wilde; and Russian authors including Isaac Babel, Fyodor Dostoyevsky, Ilya Ehrenburg, Maxim Gorki, Vladimir Lenin, Vladimir Mayakovsky, Vladimir Nabokov, Leo Tolstoy, and Leon Trotsky.

The burning of the books represents a culmination of the persecution of those authors whose oral or written opinions were opposed to Nazi ideology. Many artists, writers and scientists were banned from working and publication. Their works could no longer be found in libraries or in the curricula of schools or universities. Some of them were driven to exile (such as Albert Einstein, Sigmund Freud, Magnus Hirschfeld, Walter Mehring, and Arnold Zweig); others were deprived of their citizenship (for example, Ernst Toller and Kurt Tucholsky) or forced into a self-imposed exile from society (e.g. Erich Kästner). For other writers the Nazi persecutions ended in death. Some of them died in concentration camps, due to the consequences of the conditions of imprisonment, or were executed (like Carl von Ossietzky, Erich Mühsam, Gertrud Kolmar, Jakob van Hoddis, Paul Kornfeld, Arno Nadel, Georg Hermann, Theodor Wolff, Adam Kuckhoff, Friedrich Reck-Malleczewen, and Rudolf Hilferding). Exiled authors despaired and died by suicide, for example: Walter Hasenclever, Ernst Weiss, Carl Einstein, Walter Benjamin, Ernst Toller, and Stefan Zweig.

Responses
Helen Keller published an "Open Letter to German Students", in which she wrote: "You may burn my books and the books of the best minds in Europe, but the ideas those books contain have passed through millions of channels and will go on."

German Freedom Library 
On 10 May 1934, one year after the mass book burnings, the German Freedom Library founded by Alfred Kantorowicz was opened to assemble copies of the books that had been destroyed. Because of the shift in political power and the blatant control and censorship demonstrated by the Nazi Party, 1933 saw a “mass exodus of German writers, artists, and intellectuals". They went into exile in America, England, and France. On 10 May 1934, those writers in exile in France came together and established the Library of the Burned Books where all the works that had been banned, burned, censored, and destroyed were collected.

Alfred Kantorowicz, the author of the 1944 article Library of the Burned Books, was one of the key leaders instrumental in creating this library. In his article, he explains first-hand how the library came to be, and how it was finally destroyed. The library not only housed those books banned by the Nazis, the more important mission was to be the “center of intellectual anti-Nazi activities”. In addition, it had extensive archives “on the history of Nazism and the anti-Nazi fight in all its forms”. At the start of the war, the Nazis were virtually in control in France so the French government closed down the library and anyone associated was imprisoned or sent to concentration camps. Once the Nazis occupied Paris, the library and archives were turned over and that was the end of the Library.

In Kantorowicz’s words, “the real significance of the Library was not confined to its material existence. When we inaugurated it, we wanted to make that day of shame a day of glory for literature and for freedom of thought which no tyrant could kill by fire. And furthermore, by this symbolic action, we wanted to awaken Europe to the dangers which threatened its spiritual as well as its material existence.”

American Library of Nazi Banned Books 
A similar library, modeled after one in Paris, was opened at the Brooklyn Jewish Center in Brooklyn, New York on 15 November 1934. There were speeches given by Rev. Dr. Israel H. Levinthal, Rabbi of the Jewish Center, and the library chairman Rabbi Louis Hammer. An inaugural dinner dedicated to Albert Einstein and Heinz Liepmann was held on December 22, 1934.

The library had as its aim to "gather as many books as can be secured by authors whose books were burned by the Nazi Government at the notable bonfire on 10 May 1933. Also included were general titles relating to "general Jewish interest, in English, Hebrew and Yiddish." Among the authors whose books were available upon the library's opening were Albert Einstein, Maxim Gorki, Helen Keller, Sigmund Freud, Thomas Mann, and many others. Unlike the Paris library, the American library did not have any collection of books relating to Nazi ideology, or events or individuals in Nazi Germany.

The library was a strong advocate for the cause of Zionism, the movement for a Jewish homeland. To the minds of those in charge of the library, the Nazi book burnings represented "proof of [the] urgency" of Zionist affairs. Rabbi Stephen Wise, who spoke at the inaugural dinner, had led a protest at Madison Square Garden on the day of the book burning, and was an advocate of the Zionist movement. Thomas Mann, whose books were part of the library's collection, is quoted as saying that "what happened in Germany convinced me more and more of the value of Zionism for the Jew".

The American Library of Nazi Banned Books remained in place until the Brooklyn Jewish Center closed in the 1970's. Its collection was then donated to the Jewish Theological Seminary of America in New York City.

Allied censorship during de-Nazification

In 1946, the Allied occupation authorities drew up a list of over 30,000 titles, ranging from school books to poetry and including works by such authors as von Clausewitz. Millions of copies of these books were confiscated and destroyed. The representative of the Military Directorate admitted that the order in principle was no different from the Nazi book burnings.

Artworks were under the same censorship as other media;

all collections of works of art related or dedicated to the perpetuation of German militarism or Nazism will be closed permanently and taken into custody.

The directives were very broadly interpreted, leading to the destruction of thousands of paintings and thousands more were shipped to deposits in the U.S. Those confiscated paintings still surviving in U.S. custody include, for example, a painting "depicting a couple of middle aged women talking in a sunlit street in a small town".

In popular culture
The 1989 film Indiana Jones and the Last Crusade features a scene which is set to the backdrop of a book burning event, an event which is part of a large Nazi rally in Berlin which is attended by Adolf Hitler. The fictional scene was set in 1938 and it took place at the Institute of Aryan Culture.
Fighting the Fires of Hate: America and the Nazi Book Burnings was a traveling exhibition which was produced by the United States Holocaust Memorial Museum. In 2014, the exhibition was displayed in West Fargo, North Dakota; Dallas, Texas; and Missoula, Montana.

See also
 Books in Germany
 Degenerate art
 Denazification
 Wolfgang Herrmann, the librarian who created the original blacklist of books
 List of authors banned in Nazi Germany
 List of book-burning incidents

References
Informational notes

Citations

Bibliography
  Mauthner, Martin (2007) German Writers in French Exile, 1933-1940, London: Vallentine Mitchell. 
This article incorporates text from the United States Holocaust Memorial Museum, and has been released under the GFDL.

External links

United States Holocaust Memorial Museum – Holocaust Encyclopedia: Book Burning
 United States Holocaust Memorial Museum - Library Bibliography: 1933 Book Burnings
 Jewish Virtual Library – The Burning of the Books

Verbrannte Orte-Scorched Places, map of places in contemporary Germany

May 1933 events
1933 in Germany
Censorship in Germany
Nazi culture
The Holocaust in Germany
Book burnings
Anti-communism
Anti-Marxism
Transgender genocide